Silfverberg is a surname. Notable people with the surname include:

Anna Willcox-Silfverberg (born 1992), New Zealand freestyle skier and television reporter
Ida Silfverberg (1834–1899), Finnish painter
Jakob Silfverberg (born 1990), Swedish ice hockey player
Jan-Erik Silfverberg (born 1953), Swedish ice hockey player